Ctenophorus salinarum, commonly known as the claypan dragon or saltpan ground-dragon is a species of agamid lizard occurring in arid to semi-arid chenopod shrublands around salt lakes and claypans and in adjacent sandy heaths in southern Western Australia.

References

Agamid lizards of Australia
salinarum
Endemic fauna of Australia
Reptiles described in 1966
Taxa named by Glen Milton Storr